Entonio Pashaj (born 10 November 1984) is an Albanian professional footballer who plays as a centre-back for KFC Eppegem. Apart his natural position, Pashaj can also be deployed as right full-back or even as a defensive midfielder.

Club career

Early career
Pashaj started playing in 2003 with hometown team Partizani Tirana. He spent half season at the club  making only 3  appearances. This opted him to move to Egnatia Rrogozhinë. He became a regular at the newly promoted club and had an impressive season. He then left to join Teuta Durrës in the summer of 2005. He played for the Durrës based club for three seasons, in those seasons he helped them qualify for the UEFA Cup. He was able to play one UEFA Cup game, this came on 19 July 2007 against a very strong Slaven Belupo side in Croatia.

Tirana
Pashaj completed a move to the most successful club in Albania, Tirana, during the summer transfer window of 2008. He won the Albanian Superliga title in his first season at the club, appearing in just 3 matches.

Pashaj confirmed his return to Tirana on 12 June 2012, signing a two-year contract. He stated that despite contact from Albanian champions Skënderbeu Korçë, Flamurtari Vlorë, Vllaznia Shkodër and a host of foreign clubs.

On 22 August 2015, Pashaj left the club by terminating his contract, after he refuses to sign a new contract with Tirana. With Tirana hi played the most appearances in Europe against team like 

Fc Utrecht.   Spartak Trnava.     Zalaegerszeg.         Cs Grevenmacher.    Aalesund.   ect...

Flamurtari Vlorë

On 24 August 2015, Pashaj joined the ambitious side Flamurtari Vlorë, signing a one-year contract. There he reunited with Mario Morina, who signed with the club a couple of days earlier. Four days later, in the second matchday of Albanian Superliga season against Partizani Tirana, Pashaj and Morina started but were unable to avoid the 1–2 away lose; Pashaj conceded a 95th-minute penalty-kick, receiving a straight red card in the process.

Kukësi
On 2 August 2016, Pashaj completed a move to Kukësi by signing a one-year contract, and was presented to the media on the same day. He made 17 league appearances throughout the season as Kukësi won their first ever Albanian Superliga title.

KFC Eppegem
These days Pashaj plays for Belgian amateur side KFC Eppegem. Pashaj became a regular at the newly promoted club.

International career
Pashaj has been a former youth member of Albania, representing four times the under-21 side. Pashaj in his career played 12 UEFA Europa League matches and 4 Champions League matches

Career statistics

Honours 
Teuta 

• Albanian Cup: 2004-05

Tirana

Albanian Superliga: 2008–09
Albanian Cup: 2010–11
Albanian Supercup: 2009, 2011, 2012

Kukësi
Albanian Supercup: 2016
Albanian Superliga: 2016–17

References

External links

1984 births
Living people
Footballers from Tirana
Albanian footballers
Association football defenders
Albania under-21 international footballers
FK Partizani Tirana players
Besëlidhja Lezhë players
KS Egnatia Rrogozhinë players
KF Teuta Durrës players
KF Tirana players
KS Kastrioti players
Flamurtari Vlorë players
FK Kukësi players
Kategoria Superiore players
Albanian expatriate footballers
Expatriate footballers in Belgium
Albanian expatriate sportspeople in Belgium